Serafi Mega Mall is a shopping mall on the corner of Tahlia Street and 60th street in Jeddah, Saudi Arabia. It hosts two gaming areas, In10So and MoonToon, that feature Arcade Games, Escape Hunt, Laser Tag, Kart Racing, Bowling and Archery. 

The building has a L-shaped layout with shops arranged along a central "spine". A  Danube hypermarket is one anchor. The other anchor is a six-story office building. The project cost was $100 million

See also
 List of shopping malls in Saudi Arabia

References

2005 establishments in Saudi Arabia
Shopping malls in Saudi Arabia
Buildings and structures in Jeddah
Shopping malls established in 2005